Hoseynabad (also Romanized as Ḩoseynābād; also known as ’oseynābād) is a village in Bala Deh Rural District, Beyram District, Larestan County, Fars Province, Iran. At the 2006 census, its population was 192, in 49 families.

References 

Populated places in Larestan County